William Jefferson Jones (September 27, 1810 – May 10, 1897) was a justice of the Supreme Court of the Republic of Texas from 1840 to 1845.

References

Justices of the Republic of Texas Supreme Court
1810 births
1897 deaths
19th-century American judges